The 2010–2015 Plurinational Legislative Assembly of Bolivia was the first class of the Bolivian legislature, also known as the Plurinational Legislative Assembly, to go by that name. The Assembly was controlled in both houses by the governing Movement for Socialism (MAS-IPSP), elected with a 2/3 supermajority, although some members later separated themselves from the majority. Just four incumbent members of the 2005–2010 Congress returned: Deputy Antonio Franco; Deputy Javier Zabaleta (MAS-IPSP/MSM); Senator René Martínez (MAS-IPSP), who was a deputy; and Senator Róger Pinto, previously of Podemos and now representing PPB-CN.

The Assembly was elected as part of general elections on 9 December 2009. After the votes were counted, party strengths in Congress were as follows:

As part of a break between the MAS-IPSP and its ally the Without Fear Movement (MSM), the latter party's four deputies, elected on the MAS slate pledged in late March 2010, "to act in accord with our political identity, with our conscience, and with the people who elected us with their vote." Consequently, MAS-IPSP had 84 members in the Chambers of Deputies, while the MSM has four. However, two MSM deputies re-affiliated with the MAS-IPSP. In late 2011, at least five indigenous deputies distanced themselves from the MAS-IPSP and announced the formation of an Indigenous Bloc in the Assembly, independent of the MAS. While the Assembly's leadership has yet to officially recognize these two defections, the MAS now controls less than two-thirds of all Assembly seats.

Senate
The latest President of the Senate, elected on 19 January 2010 and serving until her death on 26 October of that year, was Ana María Romero de Campero (MAS-IPSP, La Paz). Romero had been on medical leave since February 2010, and René Martínez (MAS-IPSP, Chuquisaca) served as interim President in her absence. Martínez was confirmed as Senate President on 1 November. Martha Poma Luque (MAS-IPSP, La Paz) was elected the same day to serve as Vice President of the Senate, the first woman de pollera to hold that office. Seventeen of 36 members of the Senate are women. The 26-member MAS-IPSP majority includes all four senators from La Paz, Oruro, and Potosí; three senators from Cochabamba and Chuquisaca; and two senators from each of Santa Cruz, Beni, Pando, and Tarija.

Romero's substitute, Javier Hurtado Mercado, served as senator in her place, but resigned 15 May 2010. Her seat was filled by Mary Constancia Medina Zabaleta, the substitute for Eugenio Rojas.

Commissions
The Senate has ten legislative commissions, each with two subordinate committees, whose leadership is chosen annually. Their current leadership, chosen on 2 February 2011, is as follows:

Chamber of Deputies
The President of the Chamber of Deputies, elected on 19 January 2010, is Héctor Arce (MAS-IPSP). 33 of 130 deputies (25.38%) are women. Four parties elected deputies, the MAS-IPSP (including members of the Without Fear Movement) holds 88; the Plan Progress for Bolivia – National Convergence holds 37; the National Unity Front has 3; and Social Alliance holds 2. Sixty-nine seats were elected by individual districts (uninominal seats); 53 were elected from lists provided by each party in each department, with the number of such deputies determined by population (plurinominal seats); and seven were elected by minority indigenous peoples in the seven of the country's departments (all except Chuquisaca and Potosí). Altogether, 41 of the deputies were indigenous, including 9 women.

Commissions
The Chamber of Deputies has twelve legislative commissions, whose leadership is chosen annually. Their current leadership, chosen on 28 January 2011, is as follows:

References

Lists of political office-holders in Bolivia
Current